Bearing an Hourglass is a fantasy novel by Piers Anthony. It is the second of eight books in the Incarnations of Immortality series.

Plot summary
Some time in the future (as evidenced by technology in use that is much more advanced than in the first story), Norton—a man of about forty—is living a life of nomadic wandering when a ghost named Gawain asks him to father a child to his wife, Orlene, with whom Norton eventually falls in love. Gaea, the Incarnation of Nature, makes the child in Gawain's likeness so his bloodline would continue. Unfortunately, due to a recessive disease that runs in Gawain's family, the child dies. Orlene commits suicide shortly after.

Mourning Orlene, Norton resumes his travels, during which he is approached by Gawain. Trying to make up for his blunder, the ghost notifies Norton the office of Time (Chronos), who rules over all Earthly aspects of time, will be opening. Gawain explains that the person who holds the office of Chronos lives backwards in time until the moment of their birth or conception-no one in the book is sure of which. The ghost explains that, by living backwards, Norton can continue to see Orlene, since she is still alive in the past. Norton accepts, and Gawain leads him to the spot where the future office holder of Time, Norton's predecessor, will pass the hourglass onto Norton.

Norton immediately starts living life backwards in time, though he can temporarily go forward to interact with others. However, when he is living backwards, he is not visible to mortals. Norton experiments with his hourglass, recognised by all the Incarnations as being the most powerful magical device in the world, to halt and/or reverse time, travel many millions of years into the Earth's past, and work with the Incarnation of Fate, who needs his hourglass to help fix tangles in her threads of fate.

Because Norton lives backwards in time, his past is everyone else's future, making him an isolated character even among the other Incarnations. He also realises that this will make it impossible to have a relationship with the forward-living Orlene. He does, however, have an affair with Clotho, the youngest aspect of Fate. This is both awkward and intriguing to Norton since her past is his future.

At his new residence in Purgatory, Norton is then visited by Satan, who informs Norton that while he can travel anywhere in time with his hourglass, he cannot leave Earth. Satan claims to have the power to travel the whole universe, since evil permeates all of reality, and gives Norton some samples of this ability by having him travel to other planets where, Satan claims, time flows backwards, allowing Norton to live normally and to get involved in both a space opera ("Bat Durston and the BEMS") and an epic fantasy adventure. Satan offers Norton the ability to have that power if Norton will grant Satan a favour; to go back in time 20 years and save a man from committing suicide.

Norton goes back in time to check out this young man, but after consulting with the other Incarnations, he is informed that this man is the current office holder of the Incarnation of Death (Thanatos—in other words, Zane, from the previous novel) and that it is Zane's attempted suicide that brought him to that position. This man is needed as Thanatos to protect his girlfriend, Luna Kaftan, from Satan's mischief so she can go into politics and fulfill a prophecy of thwarting Satan.

However, a relic Satan had given Norton turned out to be a demon in disguise. When Norton went back in time, the demon disembarked a few years in the past to prevent Luna from going into politics (the demon gives an incumbent politician an antidote to keep him alive so Luna doesn't take his position in an emergency election). Due to some of the limitations of the hourglass, intercepting this demon is difficult, but Norton eventually manages to stop it.

Not giving up, Satan tries one more time by trapping Norton on one of the other planets he had an adventure on. Not sure how to get back home, Norton starts toying with the hourglass, travelling all the way back to the beginning of the observable universe and all the way to its end (from the Big Bang to the point where all matter became trapped in black holes). He realizes his adventures were not on other planets but elaborate stages on Earth, Satan having used brainwashed actors and Chronos's hourglass to control the flow of time to manipulate Norton.

Norton then finds out that the demon that created the illusion had been attached to him and, once again, disembarked at a point in the past, two years after the events of the first book, to begin a campaign to discredit Luna so she doesn't run for office. Norton then goes back in time to this point and uses his hourglass to show the world all the bad things that will happen if Luna doesn't get elected. No longer fooled by Satan's illusion, Norton discovers he can trap Satan in a time loop. Defeated, Satan stops trying to exploit him.

Literary significance and reception
Jackie Cassada in the Library Journal review says that "Amid weighty and often convoluted speculations about the nature of good and evil, time and space, and magic and science, Anthony's irrepressible humor asserts itself in unexpected ways. Far from being grim – or even allegorical – this sequel to On a Pale Horse will appeal to Anthony's large readership."

Dave Langford reviewed Bearing an Hourglass for White Dwarf #70, and stated that "The interesting ideas get buried in the dross."

Notes

External links

1984 British novels
American fantasy novels
English novels
Incarnations of Immortality
Winged unicorns
Del Rey books